Bernhard Trares (born 18 August 1965) is a German former professional footballer who played mainly as a centre-back, and manager, who last managed Würzburger Kickers.

Playing career
Trares was born in Bensheim, Hesse. Having played in his youth for SV Kirschhausen he joined Eintracht Frankfurt in 1982 and completed his formation there, and his professional career started in the second division at SV Darmstadt 98, as a defensive midfielder. He competed solely in the category during his spell with the "Lilien", scoring a career-best 11 goals in his last season.

In the 1989 summer Trares joined Alemannia Aachen also in second level, being relegated in his first year and switching to fellow league side TSV 1860 Munich in 1991, in another eventual relegation. In just two further seasons, however, the Bavarians succeeded to promote to the Bundesliga, subsequently finishing 14th to retain their league status with the player netting four times in 31 matches, while also being sent off twice.

After two additional years Trares left Munich to join SV Werder Bremen, where he became an important player in the team's defence, also helping it to the 1999 conquest of the German Cup, a penalty shootout win against Bayern Munich (1–1 after extra time). At age 36 he moved to the 2. Bundesliga's SV Waldhof Mannheim, after which he signed with Karlsruher SC for another two years in the category, retiring at the end of the 2003–04 campaign.

Altogether, Trares made 183 top flight appearances and scored 16 goals, adding 281 games with 46 in the second division.

Coaching career
In December 2004 Trares began his coaching career, serving as assistant manager with former side 1860 Munich and remaining in the post until April 2006. In January 2007 he took the reins of Wormatia Worms in Oberliga Südwest, leading the team to the Südwest-Pokal (the Cup of the Südwestdeutscher Fußballverband, i.e. South-West German football association) in his first year and qualifying it for the first round of the domestic cup.

On 29 April 2009, Trares was fired by the Worms. In November of the following year, he was appointed at FSV Frankfurt's reserves.

In January 2018 Trares became new manager of SV Waldhof Mannheim succeeding Michael Fink. He left the club on 4 July 2020.

Trares was announced as new head coach of Würzburger Kickers on 9 November 2020. He was sacked on 2 April 2021.

References

External links

Living people
1965 births
People from Bergstraße (district)
Sportspeople from Darmstadt (region)
German footballers
Association football defenders
Association football midfielders
Association football utility players
Bundesliga players
2. Bundesliga players
SV Darmstadt 98 players
Alemannia Aachen players
TSV 1860 Munich players
SV Werder Bremen players
SV Waldhof Mannheim players
Karlsruher SC players
German football managers
Wormatia Worms managers
SV Waldhof Mannheim managers
Würzburger Kickers managers
2. Bundesliga managers
3. Liga managers
Footballers from Hesse
West German footballers